Sisyrinchium californicum is a species of flowering plant in the iris family known by the common names golden blue-eyed grass, yellow-eyed-grass, and golden-eyed-grass. It is native to the west coast of North America from British Columbia to central California, where it grows in moist habitat, often in coastal areas.

Description
Sisyrinchium californicum is a rhizomatous perennial herb producing a pale green, nonwaxy stem which grows up to about 60 centimeters tall. The herbage turns dark brown or black as it dries. The flat, narrow leaves are grasslike. The flower has six tepals each between 1 and 2 centimeters in length. They are light to bright yellow, often with brown veining. The fruit is a dark-colored capsule.

References

External links

Jepson Manual Treatment - Sisyrinchium californicum
Flora of North America
Washington Burke Museum
Sisyrinchium californicum - Photo gallery

californicum
Flora of the West Coast of the United States
Flora of California
Flora of British Columbia
Garden plants of North America
Flora of North America
Plants described in 1807
Flora without expected TNC conservation status